Hugo's House of Horrors (named Hugo's Horrific Adventure in the Hugo Trilogy re-release) is a parser-based adventure game designed by independent software developer David P. Gray and published as shareware by Gray Design Associates in 1990. The game follows the character Hugo as he searches for his girlfriend Penelope in a haunted house. The player inputs text commands to solve puzzles and progress through the house. It was inspired by Leisure Suit Larry in the Land of the Lounge Lizards, and it was followed by Hugo II, Whodunit? in 1991.

Plot
Hugo's girlfriend Penelope has been imprisoned in a haunted house, and Hugo must search the house to find her. He enters the house, gets help from a mad scientist, disguises himself as a monster to avoid detection, escapes an angry dog, and finds his way into the caverns underneath the building. He evades deadly bats and a mummy and reaches a lake with an old man blocking the way. Hugo answers the man's questions and goes into the next room to find Penelope. After finding her, the two escape and they wed.

Gameplay
Hugo's movement is controlled by the arrow keys on the keyboard. All other actions are input through the text parser at the bottom of the screen in which the player types commands for Hugo. The instruction manual recommends "simple English" with commands such as "look at door" or "pick up gold", allowing many basic synonyms of a command. Through these commands, Hugo can describe what he sees to the player, interact with the environment, and solve puzzles to progress through the game. 

Actions that help solve puzzles provide the player points, and the player can achieve the maximum score by completing all such actions. Upon picking up an item, it is added to the inventory, which the player can view at any time. Hugo can then be commanded to use items in the inventory or to apply them to something in the environment. The game also provides a save/load function and a boss key to hide the program. In the Hugo Trilogy release, the text parser is supplemented by a point and click interface.

Development
Gray founded Gray Design Associates as a "backup plan" to his job as a writer for air traffic control software, creating the company after meeting a gynecologist at a party that also wrote computer programs. While he initially produced business oriented software, he also had experience designing video games by practicing with the vector graphics system provided to him while he worked for the UK Ministry of Defence.

The haunted house premise arose from a cartoon image of a haunted house that Gray had purchased, choosing to design the game around this image. He also cites Hammer House of Horror as an inspiration for the game's theme. Following the game's completion, Gray uploaded it to CompuServe forums before it saw success as shareware and as a retail game. The original DOS game was written in Microsoft Quick C, and the port to Windows was written in Visual C++.

Hugo's House of Horrors was inspired by Leisure Suit Larry in the Land of the Lounge Lizards, which uses a similar text-parsing format. Gray noted the long list of credits for the game and sought to produce a similar game entirely on his own. The title was also chosen to imitate Leisure Suit Larry, as it allowed the executable file to be titled HHH.exe, similar Leisure Suit Larry's LLL.exe. Other major inspirations cited by Gray include the use of sprites and animation by Captain Comic and the atmosphere of Colossal Cave Adventure. He has also said that the Windows point-and-click port was inspired by Beneath a Steel Sky.

Reception 
Meghann O'Neill of PC Gamer praises the game's focus on exploration and puzzles without excessive exposition. Richard Cobbett of PC Gamer criticizes the game for its poor art design, its limited puzzles, its lack of narrative, and its short length. Jenny Hanlon of Adventure Classic Gaming praises the game's "refreshing" challenges as well as its accessibility and replayability, though she criticizes the game for its dead ends and sudden endings as well as its limited parser.

Hugo's House of Horrors has been compared to the point-and-click adventure game Maniac Mansion, which features a similar premise. Gray has responded that he had never played Maniac Mansion and was only aware of the game's similarities after it was released. Two direct sequels have been released: Hugo II, Whodunit? in 1991 and Hugo III, Jungle of Doom! in 1992. The first person shooter Nitemare 3D was released in 1994 featuring the characters of Hugo and Penelope. All three of the main Hugo games were re-released for Windows as the Hugo Trilogy in 1995.

References

External links
Official site

Hugo's House of Horrors at GameFAQs
Classic DOS Games has all of the Hugo shareware demos for download.

1990 video games
Adventure games
DOS games
1990s horror video games
1990s interactive fiction
North America-exclusive video games
Shareware
ScummVM-supported games
Video games developed in the United States
Windows games